Trinité–d'Estienne d'Orves is a station on Line 12 of the Paris Métro in the commercial centre of Paris and the 9th arrondissement.

History

The station opened on 5 November 1910 as part of the original section of the Nord-Sud Company's Line A between Porte de Versailles and Notre-Dame-de-Lorette. On 27 March 1931 Line A became Line 12 of the Métro network. The station is named after the nearby church of the Trinité and the Place d'Estienne d'Orves, named after Henri Honoré d'Estienne d'Orves (1901–1941), a French Navy officer and Resistance fighter.

Nearby are the theatres of the Théâtre de Paris and Casino de Paris.

Station layout

References
Roland, Gérard (2003). Stations de métro. D’Abbesses à Wagram. Éditions Bonneton.

Paris Métro stations in the 9th arrondissement of Paris
Railway stations in France opened in 1910